Aquiles José Guzmán Matute. (born April 13, 1965) is a former Venezuelan professional boxer. He is a former World Boxing Association (WBA) flyweight (112 lb) champion.

Professional career 
Guzmán turned professional in 1985. His second opponent as a professional boxer, Gregorio Padrino, died two days after their bout as a consequence of the blows received in it. Guzman continued on and captured the WBA flyweight title in 1992 with an upset decision win over Yong-Kang Kim. He lost the belt in his first defense to David Grimán by decision (scoring of judges) in 1994.  He later challenged Saen Sor Ploenchit, Alimi Goitia, and Yokthai Sithoar for their respective belts but lost each fight. He is one of only 2 world champions in history to retire with an even record, the other being Juan Polo Perez. Some sources report his record as 13-14-3 which would make him 1 of only 3 world champions to retire with a losing record along with Jimmy Reagan and Francisco Quiroz.

See also 
 List of flyweight boxing champions
 List of Venezuelans

References

External links 
 

People from Anzoátegui
1965 births
Living people
Flyweight boxers
World flyweight boxing champions
World Boxing Association champions
Venezuelan male boxers
20th-century Venezuelan people